Adam Christiaensz Pynacker or Pijnacker (15 February 1622, Schiedam - buried 28 March 1673, Amsterdam ) was a Dutch Golden Age painter, mostly of landscapes.

Biography
Pynacker was the son of a wine merchant, who was a member of the vroedschap, or city regency. He travelled to Italy and was gone for three years. In 1658 he converted to Catholicism in order to marry Eva Maria de Geest, Wybrand de Geest's daughter. Two years later his portrait was painted by his father-in-law as a pendant to an earlier portrait of his wife. In Schiedam he baptized two children, but from 1661 until he died, he lived on the Rozengracht in Amsterdam.

Wedding portraits
De Geest was a highly successful portrait painter who painted his daughter in 1652 and two years after their marriage he painted his new son-in-law's portrait in a matching style as pendant:

Legacy

Pynacker is considered an example of an Italianate landscape painter, along with Jan Both, Jan Baptist Weenix, Nicolaes Berchem and Jan Asselyn. He specialized in decorating whole rooms. According to Houbraken, he would turn in his grave if he knew how the fashions had changed, but the poet P. Verhoek wrote a poem about one of his decorated rooms.

Pijnacker's "Deer Hunt," which had been looted from Belgium, turned up on the Russian art market in 2009.

References

 Wassenbergh, A. (1969) Het huwelijk van Adam Pijnacker en Eva Maria de Geest. In: De Vrije Fries, diel 49, pp. 93–95.

External links
 Adam Pynacker at Artist-Finder
 Adam Pynacker at the Dulwich Gallery
 Adam Pynacker at the Courtauld Institute of Art
 Pijnacker in Joconde database
 Adam Pynacker at the Web Gallery of Art
 Works and literature on Adam Pynacker at PubHist
Vermeer and The Delft School, an exhibition catalog from The Metropolitan Museum of Art (fully available online as PDF), which contains material on Adam Pynacker
Dutch and Flemish paintings from the Hermitage, an exhibition catalog from The Metropolitan Museum of Art (fully available online as PDF), which contains material on Adam Pynacker (cat. no. 20)

1622 births
1673 deaths
Converts to Roman Catholicism
Dutch Golden Age painters
Dutch male painters
People from Schiedam